Ullam Kollai Poguthae is a 2001 Indian Tamil-language romantic drama film directed by Sundar C. This film stars Prabhu Deva and Anjala Zaveri, with Karthik in a main guest appearance. Deepa Venkat and Vivek play other supporting roles. The film opened on 9 February 2001 to mixed reviews.

Plot

Anbu is a small-time mimicry artist living with his only sister Bharathi. Anbu falls in love with Bharathi's close friend Jyothi, who hails from a rich family. Jyothi visits Bharathi's home frequently, but Anbu does not have the courage to propose to Jyothi. When Anbu makes up his mind to propose to Jyothi, suddenly there comes Gautham from the US, who happens to be Jyothi's family friend. Anbu understands that Gautham and Jyothi are in a relationship and that their families plan for their wedding. A heartbroken Anbu decides to keep his love within himself.

One day, when Gautham and Jyothi are out for shopping, they meet with an accident where Gautham passes away and Jyothi loses her vision. As per the doctor's advice, Jyothi's parents decide to hide the truth about Gautham's death to Jyothi as that would put her into mental trauma. When Jyothi asks for Gautham, suddenly Anbu steps in and speaks in Gautham's voice to make her believe that Gautham is fine after the accident. Jyothi undergoes treatment, and a surgery is planned after a few weeks, following which she could get back her vision.

In the meantime, Anbu acts as Gautham to Jyothi until she gets her vision back. Anbu gets an offer to perform mimicry in a show in Australia, but he turns it down as he wishes to be with Jyothi. At the same time, Anbu feels guilty that he has missed an opportunity to perform in the Australian show, which could have helped him earn some money for Bharathi's wedding plans. Jyothi undergoes surgery and gets back her vision and she asks for Gautham. However, her parents convince her, saying that Gautham has gone to the US for some urgent work.

Anbu, unable to bear his love failure as well as his inability to earn money for Bharathi's wedding, decides to commit suicide as Bharathi would receive some relief fund from mimicry association which could be used for her wedding. Anbu writes a letter and leaves his home with poison. Bharathi finds out about Anbu's decision and searches him. Meanwhile, Jyothi watches her friend's wedding video which she attended when she was blind along with Anbu and understands that it was Anbu who was in place of Gautham. Jyothi cries upon knowing about the fate of Gautham. Bharathi comes to Jyothi's house in search of Anbu and informs her about Anbu's love and his sacrifice. Anbu goes to a stage show to meet his friends before committing suicide. Jyothi and Bharathi also reach the show where Jyothi speaks on stage thanking Anbu, hoping that he might see it from somewhere. Jyothi also proposes to marry Anbu. Anbu hears this and feels happy. Finally, Anbu and Jyothi are married.

Cast

 Prabhu Deva as Anbu
 Anjala Zaveri as Jyothi
 Deepa Venkat as Bharathi
 Vivek as Arivu
 Chitra Lakshmanan as Jyothi's father
 Jyothi as Saradha, Jyothi's mother
 Dhamu as Thamizharasan
 Mayilswamy as Anbu's friend
 Santhana Bharathi as Santhanam
 Yuvarani as Lavanya
 Kumarimuthu as Annachi
 Singamuthu as Computer astrologer
 Oru Viral Krishna Rao as Jobless man
 Bayilvan Ranganathan as Ranganathan
 Chelladurai as MLA Sarangan
 Kottai Perumal as Inspector Ekambaram
 Vasuki as Sivagami
 K. S. Jayalakshmi as Santhanam's wife
 Omakuchi Narasimhan as customer visiting gemologist
 Periya Karuppu Thevar as Illicit liquor smuggler
 Kullamani as Illicit liquor smuggler
 Idichapuli Selvaraj as Police inspector
 Vijay Ganesh as Tea master
 Kottachi as man sleeping under a tree
 Kumaresan as man with an umbrella
 Thalapathy Dinesh as Rowdy
 Vichu Viswanath as Rowdy
 Stunt Silva as Rowdy
 V. Swaminathan as Orphanage director
 A. C. Mugil as Lavanya's husband
 Soori as Illicit liquor smuggler (uncredited role)
 Karthik as Gautham (guest appearance)
 Sarath Kumar as himself (cameo appearance)
 Senthil as himself (cameo appearance)
 Gangai Amaran as himself (cameo appearance)
 Sundar C as Doctor (cameo appearance)

Soundtrack

The music was composed by Karthik Raja, while lyrics were by Pa. Vijay and Kalaikumar.

References

External links

2001 films
2000s Tamil-language films
Films directed by Sundar C.
Films scored by Karthik Raja